is a train station located in Hakata-ku, Fukuoka, operated by the Nishi-Nippon Railroad (Nishitetsu).

Lines
The station is served by the Nishitetsu Tenjin Ōmuta Line.

History 
On 28 August 2022, the facilities were moved to a new elevated station as part of a grade separation project.

Adjacent stations 

|-
|colspan=5 style="text-align:center;" |Nishi-Nippon Railroad

References

External links
 Nishitetsu website 

Railway stations in Fukuoka Prefecture
Railway stations in Japan opened in 1924